The League of Romanian Students Abroad (LSRS) is a non-profit, non-governmental, politically neutral organization led by Romanian students and graduates of universities around the world. It is one of the few organizations of its kind, specifically grouping Romanians who want to study, are studying, or have studied abroad.

The main goal of LSRS is to develop the community of Romanian students and graduates of universities around the world, facilitating their contribution to Romania's democratic future. LSRS affirms that highly trained, young Romanians represent a strategic resource for the country's development and should be promoted within society as decisive factors for Romania's future success.

History
LSRS was founded by two Romanian students, Sebastian Burduja (Harvard University) and Costin Elefteriu (King's College London), in January 2009, who perceived a need to organize the ever-growing community of Romanians studying abroad. Now, this community numbers tens of thousands of people. LSRS is one of the fastest growing Romanian non-profits, gathering over 5,000 members (defined as registered users of their website) in two years of activity. It has signed an official Memorandum with the Romanian Senate, granting it special recognition from Romanian authorities and acknowledging, for the first time, the potential of Romanian students abroad.

Organization
LSRS is organized into branches on four continents. In 2010, there were 23 active branches, spanning most Western European countries, but also Turkey, China, Chile, Russia and others. Branches are headed by Coordinators, who have nearly complete control over the activities of the branch. The general direction is set by Coordinators together with the Executive Committee and the Director's Council.
The Director's Council gathers the President, the Secretary General, and five Vice-presidents: Internal Relations, External Relations, Projects, Treasury, and Communications.
The League is defined by a strong organizational culture. Members and volunteers commonly refer to it as “the family” or “the home away from home.”

Activities
LSRS has undertaken a wide variety of projects on a national and international scale. It seeks to promote good relations with other countries, supporting Romania's image around the world through the activities of its branches. Every year, LSRS branches around the world organize small and medium-sized events to promote the Romanian culture and traditions. The main celebrations take place on December 1 of every year, Romania's National Day.
At the same time, LSRS organizes projects in Romania. The “LSRS Caravan” takes Romanian students and alumni from abroad on a journey through Romanian high schools and colleges. There they provide advice and counseling for facilitating the admission of new students to top foreign universities.

Equally important, the League organizes an annual Gala of Romanian Academic Excellence, offering prizes to the best and the brightest Romanian students abroad. The event routinely gathers around 800–1000 participants and in 2010 was held in the prestigious Palace of the Parliament (Casa Poporului). The League's policy is to invite civil society activists, journalists, but also politicians as representatives of the State. For instance, Romania's Foreign Minister Teodor Baconschi was present in 2011, along with Mircea Geoana, President of the Romanian Senate, and Crin Antonescu, President of the National Liberal Party. The event has been tremendously successful in 2010–2011. The 2011 winner, Cristina Ghenoiu, is a world-leading specialist in cancer research at the Rockefeller Center. In Europe, Graduate Student of the Year went to a talented researcher called Radu Beleca from Brunel University. Another winner is Cristina Grigore, Romanian Fulbright Alumna at Vanderbilt University.

LSRS also organized a Conference on Sustainable Development in the Black Sea Region, together with the United Nations Development Programme (UNDP), bringing together students, diplomats, and scholars to explore new development solutions.

Another activity is the Jobs on the Horizon website, developed jointly with the Dinu Patriciu Foundation. The website provides an online job-search platform for Romanian graduates of foreign universities.

In 2010, LSRS spoke out on the controversial subject of Rosia Montana, protesting against the potential mining operations by pointing out the environmental costs involved. The subject is still being debated in Romania as of February 2011.

LSRS seeks to defend and promote the legal rights and academic, professional, social, and cultural interests of its members, and smoothens up the path toward a prosperous and democratic Romania. LSRS has been created for Romanian students and graduates abroad, as well as for other Romanians interested in studying outside their home country.

Media appearances 

LSRS has had appearances in the Romanian media – TV, online, newspapers – among which Mediafax  – Celebration of Romania's National Day (in Romanian), Adevarul  – Interview with the founders of LSRS (in Romanian), and Diaspora Business Live  – LSRS Library, by LSRS Denmark (in Romanian)

References

Student organizations established in 2009